Millbrook, Llanvihangel Crucorney, Monmouthshire is a house dating from the early 17th century and is a Grade II* listed building.

History and description
The architectural historian John Newman suggests a construction date of the late 16th century,although Cadw considers a date c.1600 more probable. Newman describes the main block as a "classic two-unit house". Constructed of Old red sandstone rubble, now whitewashed, to an L-plan, the roof is a modern replacement. The interior is largely unaltered. A private residence, the house is Grade II* listed, its listing record describing it as a "well-preserved sub-medieval house with fine interiors".

Notes

References 
 

Grade II* listed buildings in Monmouthshire
Country houses in Wales